Pelliccioni is an Italian-language surname. Notable people with the surname include:

Alfredo Pelliccioni (born 1953), Sammarinese sports shooter
Flavio Pelliccioni (born 1956), Sammarinese windsurfer
Salvatore Pelliccioni (born 1933), Sammarinese sports shooter

Italian-language surnames